Vulcan Centaur is a two-stage-to-orbit, heavy-lift launch vehicle that has been under development by United Launch Alliance (ULA) since 2014 with an initial flight expected in May 2023. It is principally designed to meet launch demands for the U.S. government's National Security Space Launch (NSSL) program for use by the United States Space Force and U.S. intelligence agencies for national security satellite launches. It will replace both of ULA's existing launchers (Atlas V and Delta IV Heavy) in this role, as these launchers are retiring. Vulcan Centaur will also be used for commercial launches, including an order for 38 launches from Kuiper Systems.

The maiden flight is slated to launch Astrobotic Technology's Peregrine lunar lander for NASA's Commercial Lunar Payload Services (CLPS) program and Kuiper Systems' Kuipersat-1 and Kuipersat-2 demo satellites.

Description 
Vulcan is ULA's first new launch vehicle design; it adapts and evolves technologies that were developed for the Atlas V and Delta IV rockets of the USAF's EELV program. The first-stage propellant tanks have the same diameter as the Delta IV Common Booster Core but will contain liquid methane and liquid oxygen propellants rather than the Delta IV's liquid hydrogen and liquid oxygen.

Vulcan's upper stage is the Centaur V, an upgraded variant of the Centaur III, the world’s first high energy upper stage. The Centaur III variant is currently used on the Atlas V. Previous plans called for the Centaur V to be eventually upgraded with Integrated Vehicle Fluids technology to become the Advanced Cryogenic Evolved Stage (ACES), but this was subsequently cancelled. ULA planned to pursue human-rating certification for Vulcan to allow the launch of crewed craft, such as the Boeing CST-100 Starliner or a future version of the Sierra Nevada Dream Chaser spaceplane.

The Vulcan booster has a  outer diameter to support the Blue Origin BE-4 engines' liquid methane fuel. In September 2018, after a competition with the Aerojet Rocketdyne AR1, the BE-4 was selected to power Vulcan's first stage.

Up to six GEM-63XL solid rocket boosters (SRB)s can be attached to the first stage in pairs, providing additional thrust during the first part of the flight and allowing the six-SRB Vulcan Centaur to launch a higher mass payload than the most capable Atlas V 551.

Versions 
The Vulcan Centaur will have a four-character designation for each configuration, in which the first character represents the first stage of the vehicle; Vulcan is designated with the letter "V". The second character shows the upper stage; Centaur is designated "C". The third character represents the number of SRBs attached to the Vulcan; "0", "2", "4" or "6". The final character represents the payload-fairing length configuration, which is indicated by "S" (Standard) or "L" (Long). For example, "VC6L" would represent a Vulcan first stage, a Centaur upper stage, six SRBs and a long-configuration fairing. The most powerful Vulcan Centaur will have a Vulcan first stage, a Centaur upper stage with RL10CX engines with a nozzle extension and six SRBs.

Capabilities 
As of November 2019, the Vulcan Centaur payload figures are as follows:

Payload to low-Earth orbit (LEO) is for a 200km (120mi) circular orbit at a 28.7° inclination; payload to the International Space Station is for a 407km (253mi) circular orbit at 51.6° inclination; payload to polar LEO is for a 200km (120mi) circular orbit at 90° inclination. These capabilities are driven by the need to meet NSSL requirements, with room for future growth.

A single-core Vulcan Centaur with six solid-rocket boosters can put 27,200 kilograms into low-Earth orbit. This is almost as much as the three-core Delta IV Heavy.

History

Background 
ULA had considered a number of launch vehicle concepts in the decade since the company was formed in 2006.  Various concepts for derivative vehicles based on the Atlas and Delta lines of launch vehicles they inherited from their predecessor companies were presented to the US government for funding.  None were funded beyond the concept stage.

In early 2014, geopolitical and US political considerations led to an effort by ULA to consider the possible replacement of the Russian-supplied RD-180 engine used on the first stage booster of the Atlas V. Events such as the Annexation of Crimea by the Russian Federation in February 2014 brought into focus that relying on foreign hardware to launch critical national security spacecraft could be undesirable. Formal study contracts were issued by ULA in June 2014 to a number of US rocket engine suppliers. ULA was also facing competition from SpaceX—then seen to affect its core national security market of US military launches—and by July 2014, the US Congress was debating whether to legislatively ban future use of the RD-180 engine.

In September 2014, ULA announced that it had entered into a partnership with Blue Origin to develop the BE-4 liquid oxygen (LOX) and liquid methane (CH4) engine to replace the RD-180 on a new first stage booster. The engine was already in its third year of development by Blue Origin, and ULA said it expected the new stage and engine to start flying no earlier than 2019. Two of the -thrust BE-4 engines were to be used on a new launch vehicle booster.

In October 2014, ULA announced a major restructuring of company processes and workforce in order to halve launch costs.  One of the reasons given for the restructuring and new cost reduction goals was new competition in the launch market from SpaceX. 
ULA stated it planned to have preliminary design ideas in place for a blending of its existing Atlas V and Delta IV technologies by the end of 2014, in order to build a successor to the Atlas V that would allow them to cut Atlas V launch costs in half.

Announcement
At the time of the 2015 announcement, ULA proposed an incremental approach to rolling out the new launch vehicle and its technologies. Vulcan deployment was expected to begin with a new first stage that was based on the Delta IV's fuselage diameter and production process, and initially expected to use two BE-4 engines or the AR1 as an alternative. The initial second stage was planned to be the Atlas V's Common Centaur and Centaur III with its existing RL10 engine. A later upgrade, the Advanced Cryogenic Evolved Stage (ACES), was conceptually planned for full development in the late 2010s and to be introduced a few years after Vulcan's first flight. ULA also announced a design concept for reuse of the Vulcan booster engines, thrust structure and first stage avionics, which could be detached as a module from the propellant tanks after booster engine cutoff; the module would re-enter the atmosphere behind an inflatable heat shield. Neither the ACES second stage nor the SMART reuse for the first stage became funded development projects by ULA , even though ULA stated the "first stage propulsion module accounts for around 65% of Vulcan Centaur's costs."

Funding
Through the first several years, the ULA board of directors made quarterly funding commitments to Vulcan Centaur development. , the U.S. government had committed approximately US$1.2 billion in a public–private partnership to Vulcan Centaur development and future funding was dependent on ULA securing an NSSL contract.

By March 2016, the United States Air Force (USAF) had committed up to US$202 million of funding for Vulcan development. ULA had not yet estimated the total cost of development but CEO Tory Bruno noted "new rockets typically cost US$2 billion, including US$1 billion for the main engine". In April 2016, ULA Board of Directors member and President of Boeing's Network and Space Systems (N&SS) division Craig Cooning expressed confidence in the possibility of further USAF funding of Vulcan development.

In March 2018, Tory Bruno said the Vulcan-Centaur had been "75% privately funded" up to that point. In October 2018, following a request for proposals and technical evaluation, ULA was awarded US$967 million to develop a prototype Vulcan launch system as part of the National Security Space Launch program. Other providers Blue Origin and Northrop Grumman Innovation Systems were awarded US$500 million and US$792 million in development funding, with detailed proposals and a competitive selection process to follow in 2019. The USAF's goal with the next generation of Launch Service Agreements was to desist from "buying rockets" and move to acquire services from launch service providers but U.S. government funding of launch vehicle development continued.

Into production 
In September 2015, it was announced BE-4 rocket engine production would be expanded to increase production capacity for testing. The following January, ULA was designing two versions of the Vulcan first stage; the BE-4 version has a  diameter to support the use of less-dense methane fuel. In late 2017, the upper stage was changed to the larger and heavier Centaur V, and the launch vehicle was renamed Vulcan Centaur. The single-core Vulcan Centaur will be capable of lifting "30% more" than a Delta IV Heavy, meeting the NSSL requirements.

In May 2018, ULA announced the selection of Aerojet Rocketdyne's RL10 engine for the Vulcan Centaur upper stage. That September 2018, ULA announced the selection of the Blue Origin BE-4 engine for Vulcan's booster. That October 2018, the USAF released an NSSL launch service agreement with new requirements, delaying Vulcan's initial launch to April 2021, after an earlier postponement to 2020.

On 8 July 2019, CEO Tory Bruno released images of two Vulcan qualification test articles — the liquefied natural gas tank and thrust structure — on Twitter. The following day, Peter Guggenbach, the CEO of RUAG Space, released an image of a Vulcan payload attachment fitting. On 31 July the same year, two images of the mated LNG tank and thrust structure were similarly released. On 2 August 2019, Blue Origin released on Twitter an image of a BE-4 engine at full power on a test stand. On 6 August 2019, the first two parts of Vulcan's mobile launcher platform (MLP) were transported to the Spaceflight Processing Operations Center (SPOC) near SLC-40 and SLC-41, Cape Canaveral, Florida. On 12 August 2019, ULA submitted Vulcan Centaur for phase 2 of the USAF's launch services competition. As of February 2020, the tankage for the second operational rocket was under construction in the ULA factory in Decatur, Alabama.

In October 2019, the first launch of Vulcan was planned for July 2021, carrying Astrobotic Technology's Peregrine lunar lander. In June 2020, ULA said it could be earlier and announced a target launch date of early 2021. On 7 August 2020, the United States Space Force awarded ULA 60% of all National Security Space Launch payloads from 2022 to 2027. That December 2020, ULA said BE-4 engine delivery was expected in mid-2021, and that the Vulcan's first launch would not happen before the end of 2021.  In June 2021, Astrobotic reported that due to the COVID-19 pandemic, they needed more time to prepare Peregrine, delaying the first flight of Vulcan to 2022 and later to 2023. The Government Accountability Office (GAO) also stated that the first-stage engine was experiencing technical difficulties, and may not be qualified in time to support a Vulcan launch in 2021.

Testing before first flight 
In February 2021, ULA shipped the first completed Vulcan core booster to Florida for pathfinder tests ahead of the Vulcan's debut launch.
The Pathfinder Tanking Test core booster was transferred to SLC-41 for first stage cryogenic tanking tests in April 2021.

It was loaded with just LOX in August 2021, and with just CH4 in September 2021, and was rolled out to SLC-41 on Oct 4 for a combined LOX & CH4 tanking and pressurisation test on Oct 5.

First flight hardware

Certification flights 
On 14 August 2019, ULA won a commercial competition when it was announced the second Vulcan certification flight would be SNC Demo-1, the first of six Dream Chaser CRS-2 flights awarded to ULA. Launches are planned to begin in 2023. They will use the four-SRB Vulcan configuration. On 19 August 2019, it was announced Astrobotic Technology selected ULA to launch their Peregrine lander on the first Vulcan certification flight, named Certification-1. Peregrine is scheduled to be launched in May 2023 from SLC-41 at Cape Canaveral Space Force Station (CCSFS) on a mission to the lunar surface.

The Space Force's USSF-51 launch in late 2022 had been intended to be the first national security classified mission, but in May 2021 the spacecraft was reassigned to an Atlas V to "mitigate schedule risk associated with Vulcan Centaur non-recurring design validation".

NASA Launch Services Program
In early 2021, NASA added the Vulcan Centaur to the Launch Services II contract (NLS II). This makes the Vulcan Centaur part of the Launch Services Program and subjects it to the "on-ramp" provisions in NLS II. The on-ramp provisions allow existing launch providers to introduce new vehicles that NASA has not yet provided for.

Potential upgrades 
Since the formal announcement in 2015, ULA has spoken of several technologies that would extend the Vulcan launch vehicle's capabilities. These include enhancements to the first stage to make the most expensive components potentially reusable and enhancements to the second stage to increase its long-term mission duration to operate for months in Earth orbit cislunar space.

Long-endurance upper stages 

The ACES upper stage—fueled with liquid oxygen (LOX) and liquid hydrogen (LH) and powered by up to four rocket engines with the engine type yet to be selected—was a conceptual upgrade to Vulcan's upper stage at the time of the announcement in 2015. This stage could subsequently be upgraded to include the Integrated Vehicle Fluids technology that would allow the upper stage a much longer in-orbit life of weeks rather than hours. The ACES upper stage was eventually cancelled when in September 2020, ULA made public that the ACES development would not be continued and the Vulcan second stage would now be the Centaur V upper stage. The Centaur V is based on the upper stage used by the Atlas V but larger and more powerful. A senior executive at ULA said the Centaur V design was also heavily influenced by ACES.

However, ULA said in 2021 that it is working to add more value to upper stages by having them perform tasks such as operating as space tugs. CEO Tory Bruno says ULA is working on upper stages with hundreds of times the endurance of those currently in use.

SMART reuse 
The Sensible Modular Autonomous Return Technology (SMART) reuse concept was also announced during the initial April 2015 unveiling of Vulcan. The booster engines, avionics, and thrust structure would be detached as a module from the propellant tanks after booster engine cutoff. The module would descend through the atmosphere behind an inflatable heat shield. After parachute deployment, a helicopter would capture the module in mid-air. ULA estimated this technology would reduce the cost of the first stage propulsion by 90%, and 65% of the total first-stage cost. By 2020, ULA had not announced firm plans to fund, build and test this engine-reuse concept, though in late 2019 they stated they were "still planning to eventually reuse Vulcan's first-stage engines". 

In April 2021 CEO Tory Bruno said that the additional launches purchased by Amazon for the Kuiper satellite constellation would require a higher launch cadence and that this provided support for the business case to go forward with the SMART concept.

In July 2022, ULA pivoted and changed the high-level design objective of the engine reuse recovery concept. Rather than recover the descending booster engines with a helicopter, ULA is now planning to attempt recovery of the engines following atmospheric reentry, descent, and splashdown floating in the ocean on the inflatable aeroshell.

Three-core variant
As of late 2020, ULA said it is studying a possible three-core variant of the Vulcan Centaur. This rocket was tentatively dubbed the Vulcan Heavy. ULA earlier used the name "Vulcan Centaur Heavy" for a VC6 version with a more powerful Centaur to be introduced later, but has now renamed that version to "Vulcan Centaur Upgrade".

Planned launches

See also 

 Comparison of orbital launch systems
 
 
 Falcon 9
 Falcon Heavy

References

External links 

 
 xTTkrxVR_20 ISPCS 2015 Keynote, Mark Peller, Program Manager of Major Development at ULA and Vulcan Program Manager discusses Vulcan, 8 October 2015, Key discussion of Vulcan is at 12:20 point in video.
 A current ULA Vulcan with 5.4 m Centaur image

United Launch Alliance space launch vehicles